John Davies  (born 1856) was a Welsh international footballer. He was part of the Wales national football team, playing 1 match on 7 April 1879 against Scotland. At club level, he played for Wrexham.

See also
 List of Wales international footballers (alphabetical)

References

External links
 

1856 births
Welsh footballers
Wales international footballers
Wrexham A.F.C. players
Association football goalkeepers
Place of birth missing
Date of death missing
1929 deaths